Novopavlovka is a village in the Sokuluk District of Chüy Region of Kyrgyzstan. Its population was 20,592 in 2021. It is a centrepoint of the German community in Kyrgyzstan; its notable former inhabitants include Lilli Schwarzkopf and Edgar Bernhardt.

Population

References

Populated places in Chüy Region